Apium prostratum subsp. howense is a flowering plant in the carrot family native to Australia's Lord Howe Island. The epithet howense derives from the name of that island.

Description
It is a perennial herb, tufted, trailing and aromatic when bruised, with stems growing to 30 cm long. The pinnate leaves are 20–170 mm long. The tiny flowers are white to pinkish. The fruits are 1.5–2 mm across.

Distribution and habitat
The subspecies is endemic to Australia’s subtropical Lord Howe Island in the Tasman Sea. There it is fairly common in sand pockets and cracks in coralline rocks on the shoreline, within the splash zone. Joseph Maiden's 1889 book 'The Useful Native Plants of Australia records how 'Apium australe' could be used as a culinary vegetable and also refers to it as 'Australian Celery".

References

prostratum subsp. howense
Endemic flora of Lord Howe Island
Plants described in 1979
Apiales of Australia
Plant subspecies
Taxa named by Philip Sydney Short